Adam Reier Lundgren (born 15 February 1986 in Gothenburg) is a Swedish actor. He is best known internationally for starring in the television series Torka aldrig tårar utan handskar (Don't Ever Wipe Tears Without Gloves) in 2012, Blå ögon (Blue Eyes) in 2014 and Vår tid är nu (in english known as The Restaurant) (2017-2019). In the latter successful Netflix-series he plays restaurant-owner Peter Löwander.

Lundgren studied at The Academy of Music and Drama in Gothenburg in 2009–2012. Although he was a junior hockey player for many years, he abandoned his hockey ambitions in favour of acting at the age of 16. In 2013, he won the Rising Star award at the Stockholm International Film Festival.

In 2014, he appeared as neo-Nazi Mattias in SVT's political thriller Blå ögon. It was broadcast in the UK between April and May 2016 on More 4 and made available on demand on the All 4 portal as part of its Walter Presents world drama offering.

Filmography 
 2005 – Storm
 2005 – Sandor slash Ida
 2007 – Ciao Bella
 2007 – Pirret
 2007 – Linas kvällsbok
 2008 – LOVE/My name is Love (short film)
 2008 – Höök (TV series)
 2008 – Oskyldigt dömd (TV series)
 2009 – 183 dagar (TV series)
 2009 – Maud och Leo
 2009 – Främmande land
 2010 – Olycksfågeln (TV film)
 2010 – Fyra år till
 2010 – Apflickorna
 2011 – Irene Huss - Tystnadens cirkel
 2011 – Anno 1790 (TV series)
 2012 – Bitchkram
 2012 – Don't Ever Wipe Tears Without Gloves (TV series)
 2013 – Din barndom ska aldrig dö
 2013 – Känn ingen sorg
 2014 – Blå ögon (TV series)
 2017 – Vår tid är nu
 2019 – Chernobyl
 2022 – Clark

References

External links 

Planthaber/Kildén/Mandic agency

1986 births
Living people
Swedish male television actors
People from Gothenburg
Swedish male film actors